The minister of international development is a minister of the Crown in the Canadian Cabinet. The minister has responsibility for the international development portfolio and is one of the three ministers (along with the minister of foreign affairs and the minister of international trade) responsible for Global Affairs Canada.

Between 1995 and 2015 the post was known as the Minister for International Cooperation.

Previous post

Prior to its current title, the post was held as Minister of State (External Relations) from 1982-1983, Minister for External Relations between 1983-1995, and as the Minister for International Cooperation from 1995 and 2015.

List of ministers
Key:

References

International Cooperation

Minister for International Cooperation (Canada)